Peter James Fox (born 9 May 1967) is a New Zealand sailor. He competed in the Laser event at the 2000 Summer Olympics.

References

External links
 

1967 births
Living people
New Zealand male sailors (sport)
Olympic sailors of New Zealand
Sailors at the 2000 Summer Olympics – Laser
People from Levin, New Zealand